Rešica is a village and municipality in Košice-okolie District in the Kosice Region of eastern Slovakia.

History
In historical records the village was first mentioned in 1319.

Geography
The village lies at an altitude of 460 metres and covers an area of 12.497 km².
It has a population of about 360 people. Almost 50 people have moved out of the municipality since 1991.

Ethnicity
The population is entirely Slovak in ethnicity.

Transport
The nearest train station is at Cecejovce.

External links

Villages and municipalities in Košice-okolie District